German submarine U-2518 was a Type XXI U-boat of Nazi Germany's Kriegsmarine at the end of World War II, which later served in the French Navy, where she was commissioned as Roland Morillot, in honour of Roland Morillot, a French submarine officer killed in 1915.

Service history

Kriegsmarine
The submarine was laid down on 16 August 1944 at the Blohm & Voss yard at Hamburg, launched on 4 October 1944, and commissioned on 4 November 1944 under the command of Oberleutnant zur See Friedrich Weidner. After training with 31st U-boat Flotilla, U-2518 was transferred to 11th U-boat Flotilla for front-line service on 1 April 1945, though this was too late for the U-boat to sail on any combat patrols or sink any ships. On 9 May 1945, she surrendered to British forces at Horten Naval Base, Norway. She was taken to Lisahally, Londonderry. U-2518 was handed over by the British to the French Marine Nationale. On her journey from Lisahally to France, she stopped in Dún Laoghaire in February 1946.

Marine Nationale
The U-boat arrived at Cherbourg on 26 February 1946, and after repairs made her first voyage on 20 August. In January 1948 she sailed from Toulon to Casabianca completely submerged, and in April 1948 was permanently assigned to the Navy. On 14 February 1951 she was renamed Roland Morillot. In August 1956 she took part in Operation Musketeer during the Suez Crisis. In 1967 the submarine was placed in reserve, and on 21 May 1969 was sold to Lotti S.p.A. at La Spezia for scrapping.

See also

 , a Type VIIC U-boat, that served in the French Navy, 1945–1961

References

Bibliography

External links
 
 Roland Morillot at u-boote.fr 

Type XXI submarines
Ships built in Hamburg
U-boats commissioned in 1944
World War II submarines of Germany
Captured U-boats
Foreign submarines in French service
Cold War submarines of France
1944 ships